Standing in the Light is the fourth studio album released by English jazz-funk band Level 42. The album, released in 1983, generated the group's first top 10 in the UK Albums Chart, peaking at No. 9. The album was well received by critics and fans.

The album was released in many countries beyond the United Kingdom, in Greece, Germany (peaked in #27 on charts), Sweden (peaked in #25 on charts), Japan, Canada, the United States and Middle East.

The first single, "Out of Sight, Out of Mind", originally produced by Wally Badarou, was released only in the United Kingdom and peaked at No. 41 on the United Kingdom charts. For the album version, the song was remixed and a new lead vocal recorded. The second single "The Sun Goes Down (Living It Up)" was released in the United Kingdom, Oceania and other parts of Europe and America and gave the group its first top ten hit in the United Kingdom. The third single, "Micro-kid", peaked at No. 37 on the UK Singles Chart. On the final track "The Machine Stops", the lyrics are inspired by the science fiction story of the same name written by E. M. Forster in 1909.

The album was re-released 2000 with bonus tracks in a two-disc compilation with the album The Pursuit of Accidents in the United Kingdom by the label Polydor.

Track listing
 "Micro-kid"  (Wally Badarou, Mark King, Phil Gould, Brian Taylor, Allee Willis) – 4:44
 "The Sun Goes Down (Living It Up)"  (Badarou, King, Mike Lindup, P. Gould) – 4:15
 "Out of Sight, Out of Mind" (P. Gould, King, Lindup, Boon Gould) – 5:12
 "Dance On Heavy Weather" (King, P. Gould, Lindup, Taylor, Larry Dunn, Verdine White) – 4:27
 "A Pharaoh's Dream (Of Endless Time)" (King, P. Gould, Lindup) – 4:21
 "Standing in the Light" (King, P. Gould, Badarou) – 3:42
 "I Want Eyes"  (King, P. Gould) 4:59
 "People"  (Lindup) – 4:55
 "The Machine Stops" (King, P. Gould, Badarou) – 4:15

Personnel 
Level 42
 Mark King – vocals, scat, bass guitar, rototoms
 Mike Lindup – vocals, acoustic piano, electric piano, Memorymoog, Prophet-5, vocoder
 Boon Gould – guitars
 Phil Gould – drums, percussion, marimba, rototoms, backing vocals
with:
 Wally Badarou – Prophet-5, E-mu Emulator
 Paulinho da Costa – percussion
 Andrew Woolfolk (also of Earth, Wind & Fire) – soprano saxophone on "A Pharaoh's Dream (Of Endless Time)"

Production 
 Larry Dunn – producer (1, 2, 4-9)
 Verdine White – producer (1, 2, 4-9)
 Wally Badarou – producer (3)
 Chris Brunt – recording (1, 2, 4-9), mixing 
 Paul Staveley O'Duffy – recording (3)
 Barbara Rooney – recording assistant (1, 2, 4-9)
 Ben Ing – mix assistant 
 Indigo Ranch Studios (Malibu, California) – mixing location 
 Neville Brody – sleeve design
 Sheila Rock – photography

Charts

Singles

References

External links 
 
 Level 42's complete discography

1983 albums
Level 42 albums
Polydor Records albums